Nordic Seaplanes is a Danish airline which operates a scheduled daily passenger route by seaplane between the ports of Copenhagen and of Aarhus, Denmark.
The company started these scheduled passenger flights in 2016, and is looking into to add electric planes to its fleet.

Destinations
port of Aarhus (ICAO:EKAC)
port of Copenhagen (ICAO:EKCC)

Fleet
Two DHC-6 Twin Otter, adopted as seaplane

References

External links

Official website

Airlines of Denmark
Companies based in Aarhus
Airlines established in 2016
2016 establishments in Denmark